Arkansas Highway 329 (AR 329, Hwy. 329) is a north–south state highway of  in Sevier County, Arkansas. The route funs from Highway 24 near Lockesburg northwest to US Route 70 Business (US 70B) and Highway 41 in De Queen.

Route description
The highway begins west of Lockesburg at Highway 24. Highway 329 runs through forested areas nearby the De Queen and Eastern Railroad tracks generally northwest until it meets US 70B and Highway 41 in De Queen. This junction is near the De Queen and Eastern Railroad Machine Shop on the National Register of Historic Places.

Major intersections

History
Highway 329 is part of the original 1926 alignment of U.S. Route 71.

References

329
Transportation in Sevier County, Arkansas
U.S. Route 71